Dichagyris signifera is a moth of the family Noctuidae. It is found from Spain and France, east through central and southern Europe (including Italy and Greece) to Latvia and Russia.

Description
The wingspan is 34–40 mm.Warren (1914) states E. signifera F. (7 g). Forewing brownish grey with a reddish tinge ; the costal area , the median and submedian veins speckled pale grey and black; the veinlets blackish; a black streak from base below
cell: stigmata as in turbans [error],Dichagyris disturbans  but the reniform broader and not angled inwards; marginal area more prominently streaked with dark ; hindwing whitish, with a fuscous tinge towards margin, especially in the female.Widely spread, occurring in the Alps of France and Switzerland, in Germany, Austria, Hungary and Russia,
and throughout W. Asia; Armenia, Asia Minor, Syria, Persia, Turkestan and W. Siberia; — in the ab.
improcera Stgr. [Dichagyris orientis (Alphéraky, 1882)](7g), which is a duller insect, more like turbans [Dichagyris disturbans (Püngeler, 1914)] , the markings are all obscured; 
orientis Alph.Dichagyris orientis  (7g) is much paler, uniform smooth ochreous grey, with the black basal streak and costal 
spots prominent ; both these aberrations are confined to W. Asia.

Biology
The larvae feed on Echium, Poa and Plantago species.

References

External links

Lepiforum.de

signifera
Moths of Europe
Moths described in 1775